There have been approximately fifteen Moroccans detained in Guantanamo.  
The United States maintained over 750 captives in extrajudicial detention in 
the Guantanamo Bay detention camps, in Cuba.
Different sources offer different estimates of the number of Moroccans who have been held.
The US Department of Defense released what they called an official list of all the detainees who had been held in military custody in Guantanamo.  It lists fifteen Moroccan detainees.

List of Moroccan Guantanamo detainees

References

Lists of Guantanamo Bay detainees by nationality
Morocco–United States relations